The Darwin Ranch in Teton County, Wyoming near Cora, Wyoming is a guest ranch which was listed on the National Register of Historic Places in 2021.

Description
It is a remote inholding within Bridger-Teton National Forest and provides easy access to forest lands and to the Gros Ventre Wilderness.

It has rental log cabins which, in 2021, command rental rates around $6,000/week.

History
It was home of Fred Dorwin, a trader and fur trapper, and came to be called Darwin Ranch following appearance of it as that, by a typo, on a map.

It was managed for more than 50 years by Loring Woodman, after his parents purchased the ranch in 1964.

The property includes 15 log buildings and 9 structures. The buildingsand structures were "all hand-constructed with logs, that are a combination of historic and a few modern structures designed to match the original buildings. Buildings on the site include the main lodge, guest cabins, and working ranch outbuildings. The site is surrounded by pine-tree covered mountains, with Kinky Creek and the Gros Ventre River winding through the property."

The property was deemed significant "for its representation of historic events related to Commerce and Settlement. As a homestead property, the ranch is an excellent example of early settlement in the American West. Early ranch residents supplemented their income in order to maintain the place with trapping in the surrounding mountains; an important form of early white settlement. The Darwin Ranch has more recently been sustained, though, as a guest or “dude” ranch, also an important commerce example. Guest ranches have long been a popular form of recreation. In the case of the Darwin Ranch, recreation is also extended to the use of the property by wealthy families for private seasonal enjoyment. Both uses of the ranch, as a commercial guest ranch and for private use, are important examples of how the commercial landscape of Teton County and other scenic areas in Wyoming developed to modern day."

It was also deemed significant for "its excellent example of Western Craftsman Architecture. The buildings and structures, both historic and more modern, maintain a high level of location, design, setting, materials, workmanship, feeling, and association for this unique western architecture. The combined western architecture with the traditional use of commerce from the settlement homestead era, create an excellent example of a significant historic property."

Climate

According to the Köppen Climate Classification system, Darwin Ranch has a subarctic climate, abbreviated "Dfc" on climate maps.

See also
National Register of Historic Places listings in Teton County, Wyoming

References

External links
Darwin Ranch, official site

Buildings and structures in Wyoming
Historic districts on the National Register of Historic Places in Wyoming
Rustic architecture in Wyoming
Dude ranches in Wyoming
Ranches in Wyoming
Ranches on the National Register of Historic Places in Wyoming
Bridger–Teton National Forest
Log buildings and structures in Wyoming